"For You" is a song by American rock band the Calling that was recorded for the soundtrack to American superhero film Daredevil (2003). It was also featured in the film's closing credits. "For You" was released as a single in February 2003 and reached the top 50 in Italy and New Zealand.

Charts

References

Daredevil (film series)
2003 singles
2003 songs
The Calling songs
Epic Records singles
Songs written by Aaron Kamin
Songs written by Alex Band
Wind-up Records singles